Ham Deok-ju ( Hanja: 咸德柱; born 13 January 1995) is a South Korean professional baseball pitcher who is currently playing for the Doosan Bears of the KBO League.

He graduated from Wonju High School and was selected to Doosan Bears by a draft in 2013 (2nd draft, 5th round). In 2018, he changed back number from No.61 to No.1. He achieved his personal best of nine wins in 2017 season.

He represented South Korea at the 2018 Asian Games.

References

External links 
 Career statistics and player information from the KBO League
 Ham Deok-ju at Doosan Bears Baseball Club

1995 births
Living people
Baseball players at the 2018 Asian Games
Asian Games gold medalists for South Korea
Medalists at the 2018 Asian Games
Asian Games medalists in baseball
Doosan Bears players
KBO League pitchers
People from Wonju
South Korean baseball players
Sportspeople from Gangwon Province, South Korea